Louis Albert Merchant (January 18, 1860 – January 21, 1950) was an American politician who served as   Mayor of Pittsfield, Massachusetts.

Merchant was employed as a clerk.

In 1899 Merchant represented ward six on the Pittsfield Common Council.

Notes

Mayors of Pittsfield, Massachusetts
Massachusetts city council members
1860 births
1950 deaths